Conogethes parvipunctalis is a moth in the family Crambidae. It was described by Hiroshi Inoue and Hiroshi Yamanaka in 2006. It is found in Japan's Ryukyu Islands.

References

Moths described in 2006
Spilomelinae